Lennox Castillo (born 19 November 1985) is a Belizean footballer who plays as a striker for Police United (Belize). Besides Belize, he has played in Panama.

Career

He is nicknamed Criminal.

He played for Belize under-21 national team.

He is a Belize international.

In 2006, he was top scorer of the Belize league with New Site Erei. 

In 2007, Castillo signed for Panamanian side Árabe Unido.

References

External links
 

Belizean footballers
Belizean expatriate sportspeople in Panama
C.D. Árabe Unido players
Police United FC (Belize) players
New Site Erei players
Living people
Expatriate footballers in Panama
Association football forwards
Belize international footballers
Belizean expatriate footballers
1985 births